= David Sheeran =

- Born: Ireland
- Occupation: DJ

David Sheeran, known professionally as SHEE, is an Irish disc jockey and music producer. He is known for his deep house production abilities.
